With This Ring is a 1925 American silent drama film directed by Fred Windemere and starring Alyce Mills, Forrest Stanley, and Lou Tellegen. In America it was distributed by the independent outfit Preferred Pictures while its British release was originally to be handled by Vitagraph, before that company was acquired by Warner Bros. who distributed it on the British market in 1926.

Synopsis
While marooned on a desert island, Cecilie Vaughn and Donald Van Buren live as man and wife and she falls pregnant. Donald is attacked and believed dead and Cecilie is rescued. She visits his wealthy family, but they refuse to recognize her or her son and Donald's brother Rufus offers to make her his mistress. She agrees instead to a marriage proposal from the kindly family lawyer, before Donald returns and they are reunited.

Cast

References

Bibliography
 Connelly, Robert B. The Silents: Silent Feature Films, 1910-36, Volume 40, Issue 2. December Press, 1998.
 Munden, Kenneth White. The American Film Institute Catalog of Motion Pictures Produced in the United States, Part 1. University of California Press, 1997.

External links

 

1925 films
1925 comedy films
American silent feature films
American comedy films
American black-and-white films
Preferred Pictures films
Films directed by Fred Windemere
1920s English-language films
1920s American films
Silent American comedy films